Ramer is a city in McNairy County, Tennessee. The population was 354 at the 2000 census.

The community was named after the Ramer family of settlers.

Geography
Ramer is located at  (35.070243, -88.615851).

Demographics

As of the census of 2000, there were 354 people, 142 households, and 102 families residing in the city. The population density was 206.8 people per square mile (79.9/km2). There were 155 housing units at an average density of 90.6 per square mile (35.0/km2). The racial makeup of the city was 87.29% White, 11.86% African American, and 0.85% from two or more races. Hispanic or Latino of any race were 3.39% of the population.

There were 142 households, out of which 28.9% had children under the age of 18 living with them, 58.5% were married couples living together, 10.6% had a female householder with no husband present, and 27.5% were non-families. 25.4% of all households were made up of individuals, and 12.0% had someone living alone who was 65 years of age or older. The average household size was 2.49 and the average family size was 2.94.

In the city, the population was spread out, with 26.0% under the age of 18, 8.5% from 18 to 24, 23.7% from 25 to 44, 28.0% from 45 to 64, and 13.8% who were 65 years of age or older. The median age was 36 years. For every 100 females, there were 97.8 males. For every 100 females age 18 and over, there were 95.5 males.

The median income for a household in the city was $27,292, and the median income for a family was $31,071. Males had a median income of $31,094 versus $18,125 for females. The per capita income for the city was $14,942. About 12.7% of families and 16.8% of the population were below the poverty line, including 28.4% of those under age 18 and 7.1% of those age 65 or over.

References

Cities in McNairy County, Tennessee
Cities in Tennessee